Gemba Football Club is an Indonesian professional football club based in Kairatu, West Seram, Maluku. Club plays in Liga 3.

Honours
 Liga 3 Maluku
 Runners-up: 2021

References

External links

West Seram Regency
Football clubs in Maluku (province)
Football clubs in Indonesia
Association football clubs established in 2015
2015 establishments in Indonesia